Wolfgang Dietrich of Castell-Remlingen (German - Wolfgang Dietrich zu Castell-Remlingen) (6 January 1641 – 8 April 1709) was a German nobleman. From 1668 until his death he was the ruler of the county of Castell-Remlingen, sharing power with his brother Friedrich Magnus of Castell-Remlingen. He also held other offices in the Margraviate of Ansbach and the Electoral Palatinate.

The county before Wolfgang Dietrich

Life
He was born in Remlingen, Bavaria. He died in Castell, aged 68.

Marriages and issue
In Remlingen on 7 July 1667 he married Elisabeth Dorothea Schenkin of Limpurg in Obersontheim. With her he had six children, two of whom died in infancy:
 Sophie Dorothea (* 21 June 1668 in Remlingen; † 25 December 1732 in Castell)
 Christiana Theodora (* 12 June 1669 in Remlingen; † 15 August 1674 in Neustadt an der Aisch)
 Charlotte Juliane (* 14 September 1670 in Castell; † 5 February 1696 in Rüdenhausen)
 Luise Florina (* 16 April 1672 in Castell; † 27 July 1676 in Castell)
 Christiana Elisabeth (* 21 June 1674 in Neustadt; † 16 March 1717 in Neuenstein)
 Karl Friedrich Gottlieb (* 16 April 1679 in Mannheim; † 9 May 1743 in Hamburg), Wolfgang Dietrich's successor.

After Elisabeth Dorothea's death, Wolfgang Dietrich married again, on 7 March 1693 to Dorothea Renate of Zinzendorf and Pottendorf. He had eight children with her:
 Eleonore Auguste Amalie (* 27 December 1693 in Castell; † 25 May 1712 in Castell)
 Wolfgang Georg (* 20 September 1694 in Castell; † 22 September 1735 in Castell)
 Charlotte Luise Renata (* 24 January 1696 in Castell; † 6 January 1699)
 Ludwig Theodor (* 2 November 1698 in Castell; † 11 December 1698 in Castell)
 Karoline Friederike Luise (* 15 May 1702 in Castell; † 17 February 1748 in Rehweiler)
 Sophie Theodora (* 12 May 1703 in Castell; † 8 January 1777 in Herrnhut)
 August Franz Friedrich (* 31 July 1705 in Castell; † 16 May 1767 in Castell)
 Ludwig Friedrich (* 23 February 1707 in Castell; † 22 June 1772 in Rehweiler)

Bibliography 
 Max Domarus: Die Porträts im Schloss Rüdenhausen. In: Freunde Mainfränkischer Kunst und Geschichte e.V. (ed.): Mainfränkische Hefte. Heft 46. Volkach 1966.
 Wilhelm Engel: Haus u. Herrschaft Castell in der fränkischen Geschichte. In: Gesellschaft für fränkische Geschichte (ed.): Castell. Beiträge zu Kultur und Geschichte von Haus und Herrschaft. Neujahrsblätter XXIV. Würzburg 1952. S. 1-19.
 Otto Meyer: Das Haus Castell. Landes- und Standesherrschaft im Wandel der Jahrhunderte. In: Otto Meyer, Hellmut Kunstmann (ed.): Castell. Landesherrschaft- Burgen- Standesherrschaft. Castell 1979. S. 9-53.

1641 births
1709 deaths
German nobility